Gannon M. Shepherd (born January 4, 1977) is a former American football tackle for the Jacksonville Jaguars and the Cleveland Browns of the National Football League. He played college football at Duke.

Professional football career

Chicago Bears 
The Chicago Bears signed Shepherd on April 28, 2000, to play offensive tackle. He was one of six undrafted rookies in the Bears' training camp that summer. He was released by the Bears on August 23, 2000.

Jacksonville Jaguars 
Shepherd was signed by the Jacksonville Jaguars on December 6, 2000. He did not play in any games during the 2000 season, and played in only one in the 2001 season: a 21–3 win at home over the Pittsburgh Steelers on September 9, 2001. The Jaguars released him on October 30, 2001.

Cleveland Browns 
Shepherd was signed to the Cleveland Browns' practice squad on November 21, 2001.

Atlanta Falcons 
Shepherd was a part of the Atlanta Falcons team during the 2002 off-season. He was waived by the Falcons as part of an injury settlement on September 6, 2002, and released three days later.

References 

Living people
1977 births
American football offensive tackles
American football defensive tackles
Atlanta Falcons players
Chicago Bears players
Cleveland Browns players
Duke Blue Devils football players
Jacksonville Jaguars players
Players of American football from Georgia (U.S. state)